Gopal Bhar or Gopal Bhand was a court jester in medieval Bengal. He was in the court of Raja Krishnachandra (1710–1783), the then-king of Nadia in the 18th century. Gopal used to give joy to others by laughter and ridicule. The king considered Gopal as a Navaratna of his court. His statue can still be seen in the palace of Krishnachandra and in Ghurni, Krishnagar town. Gopal is believed to have possessed a keen intelligence.

Life of Gopal 
Gopal, born in a low-caste family, was a prodigy since childhood. His father died when Gopal was young, and his mother was murdered via Sati-daha. His older brother was forced into slavery and he was abducted by a robber gang. Eventually a lady raised him, and in adulthood Gopal became a presence in the royal court of Krishnanagar in West Bengal. This courtier of Raja Krishnachandra was a witness in the most heinous conspiracy to remove the Nawab of Bengal. But Gopal never gave in to this conspiracy. Gopal repeatedly rebuked Raja Krishnachandra when he was partnering with Mir Jafar, Ghaseti Begum and others to remove the then Nawab of Bengal (Siraj ud-Daulah). On the contrary, he was ridiculed by the king and his courtiers. Raja Krishnachandra said that he would refrain from this plan only if he could go in front of the Nawab and cut his forehead.

Even at the risk of his own life, Gopal went to Murshidabad for Krishnachandra. When he was not allowed to enter in front of the Nawab, he was bitten by a guard. Then when he was brought before the Nawab of Justice, Gopal really broke the Nawab. The Nawab informed that Gopal would be hanged the next day.

Meanwhile, Gopal informed Mir Jafar that he had come to the Nawab to expose all the conspiracies. But since his breadwinner Raja Krishnachandra would also be trapped, he did not divulge it. Then at the instigation of Nawab Mir Jafar ordered the execution of Gopal. But there were no trace of Gopal in it. On the contrary, he broke the Nawab once again. 
The Nawab thinks that Gopal is insane. So the Nawab released him. Returning to Krishnanagar, Gopal once again tried to convince the king. But the king did not listen to him. In 1757, the humiliated Gopal left the country (Krishnanagar) without anyone noticing. Then no trace of him was found.

Stories
Tales of his exploits are narrated in West Bengal and Bangladesh to this day in numerous short stories. Their origin may be traced to local oral cultures of humour. The stories are popular and humorous, often ridiculing figures of authority, including the king, Krishnachandra, himself. Many of his stories depict him coming up with inventive and clever answers to satisfy the whimsical requests of royal personages, such as the Maharaja and the Rani. In some stories, Raja Krishnachandra asks him to complete certain tasks specifically to test his intelligence, or to embarrass him in public. Gopal Bhar always rebuffs the attempt successfully. The application of humour never crosses over to the realm of direct disrespect, but manages to point out the weakness in the opponent's argument or conviction. As such, his stories are comparable with those of Birbal, Tenali Raman, Gonu Jha and Nasreddin.

Authenticity
In early nineteenth century, Gopal Bhar's name was first mentioned in Bengali literature. It is often said that Gopal Bhar is a legendary personality. But a reference has found that there was a respectful and old bodyguard of the king of Nadia, Raja Krishnachandra and Protection incharge of the city named Shankar Taranga who was given special status by the king for his courage and knowledge and probably gave rise to the legend of Gopal Bhar. There are many contradictory views regarding Gopal Bhar, whether he existed or not. Acharya Sukumar Sen opined that the character Gopal is purely fictitious. But some sources claim that Gopal was a true character.

In popular culture
 Gopal Bhar, a Bengali comedy film directed by Amal Sur was released in 1980. In that film, Santosh Dutta portrayed the character of Gopal Bhar.
 Gopal Bhar (TV series), a Bengali television series was made where Raktim Samanta played the role of Gopal Bhar as a young child. The series aired on Star Jalsha from 2017 to 2018. 
 Gopal Bhar (Cartoon Series), an animation series also popular in Sony Aath YouTube channel. On YouTube, more than 1000 episodes are made and still counting.

See also
 Gonu Jha
 Tenaliram
 Birbal
 Nasreddin

References

Further reading
 
 

18th-century Indian people
Jesters
Humour and wit characters of India
Bengali Hindus
18th-century Bengalis
People from Krishnagar